Choua is a surname. Notable people with the surname include:

Lol Mahamat Choua (1939–2019), Chadian politician
Mohamed Choua (born 1992), Moroccan basketball player